Kleine Freiheit (international title: A Little Bit of Freedom) is a 2003 film by Kurdish director Yüksel Yavuz about the friendship (and later relationship) between two teenage boys who are illegal immigrants in Germany.

Plot 
Baran (Cagdas Bozkurt) is a young Kurd who was sent to Hamburg after his parents, who had helped Kurdish rebels, were betrayed and subsequently killed by the Turkish militia. Now that Baran is 16, he is no longer allowed to stay in Germany and faces the bleak prospect of getting deported back.

Baran meets Chernor (Leroy Delmar), an African boy who has the same problem and trafficks drugs to make some money.

Things get even more complicated when Baran spots the traitor of his family and wants to kill him. However, the man pleads for his life and Baran spares him. Finally, both Cherno and Baran, who had made a desperate attempt to free Cherno, are arrested by the police.

Cast
 Cagdas Bozkurt as Baran
 Necmettin Çobanoglu as Selim
 Leroy Delmar as Chernor
 Sunay Girisken as Nergiz
 Nazmi Kirik as Haydar
 Suzana Rozkosny as Alma
 Naci Özarslan as Chef
 Thomas Ebermann as Käpt'n
 Oktay Çagla as Delil
 Demir Gökgöl as Haci Baba

Other cast members (listed alphabetically):
 Alpay Aksungur as Küchenhilfe
 Turgay Aydin as Murat
 Ibrahim Bah as Chenors Chef
 Jasmina Barjamovic as Nergiz' Cousine
 Charlotte Crome as Beamtin
 Abdulrahman Gülbeyaz as Musiker
 Bright A. Isokpan as Tellerwäscher
 Joachim Kappl as Beamter
 Tolga Kaya as Genosse
 Atilla Kiliç as Genosse
 Joanna Kitzl as Meryem
 Samuel Makinde as Chenors erster Freund
 Ismael Nabe as Chenors zweiter Freund
 Piro as Fleischlieferant
 Thomas Roth as Fahnder
 Holger Umbreit as Fahnder
 Cafer Yildiz as Gemüsehändler
 Sema Çagla as Genosse

Critical reaction 
In 2003, it was shown at the Cannes Film Festival.

The movie was critically well-received, particularly because of its accurate depiction of the Turkish–Kurdish conflict and the acting prowess of the nonprofessional actors. Cagdas Bozkurt won an acting prize at the Ankara film festival, while the movie won a viewers' choice award in Istanbul (the International Istanbul Film Festival) and it won the 'Grand Prix' at the Ankara International film festival.

Kleine Freiheit, the German title of the movie, ("Little Freedom", translated literally) is a wordplay on Große Freiheit (literally "Great Freedom"), the rather famous name of a street in the red light St. Pauli district where the plot is set.

References

External links

2003 films
Films set in Hamburg
German LGBT-related films
2003 drama films
LGBT-related drama films
2003 LGBT-related films
2000s German films